Ahmed Esad Pasha (1828; Chios – 1875; Izmir) was an Ottoman conservative statesman. He was Grand Vizier of the Ottoman Empire during two terms in 1873 and 1875.

References 

1828 births
1875 deaths
Politicians from Chios
Ottoman Military Academy alumni
Ottoman Military College alumni
Field marshals of the Ottoman Empire
19th-century Grand Viziers of the Ottoman Empire
Ottoman governors of Aidin